Samuel W. Kinnaird (May 2, 1840 – April 20, 1923) was a Union Navy sailor in the American Civil War and a recipient of the U.S. military's highest decoration, the Medal of Honor, for his actions at the Battle of Mobile Bay.

Kinnaird's Background
Born on May 2, 1840, in New York City, Kinnaird was still living in the state of New York when he joined the Navy. For this action, he was awarded the Medal of Honor four months later, on December 31, 1864.

Citation
Kinnaird's official Medal of Honor citation reads:
Served as a landsman on board the U.S.S. Lackawanna during successful attacks against Fort Morgan, rebel gunboats and the ram Tennessee in Mobile Bay, 5 August 1864. Showing a presence of mind and cheerfulness that had much to do with maintaining the crew's morale, Kinnaird served gallantly through the action which resulted in the capture of the prize rebel ram Tennessee and in the destruction of batteries at Fort Morgan.

Kinnaird died on April 20, 1923, at age 82 and was buried in the New York City neighborhood of Woodside, Queens.

References

External links 
 

1840 births
1923 deaths
Military personnel from New York City
People of New York (state) in the American Civil War
Union Navy sailors
United States Navy Medal of Honor recipients
American Civil War recipients of the Medal of Honor